West Linton is a village and civil parish in southern Scotland, on the A702. It was formerly in the county of Peeblesshire, but since local government re-organisation in the mid-1990s it is now part of Scottish Borders. West Linton has a long history, and holds an annual traditional festival called The Whipman Play.

Prehistory and archaeology 
There is considerable evidence of the pre-historic occupation of the area. A right-of-way through the foothills of the Pentland Hills follows an important pre-historic routeway linking the Upper Clyde valley with the estuary of the River Forth. It is marked in this section by two large Bronze Age cairns, one of them being the best preserved example of its kind in the country. In 1994 a Bronze Age cemetery was excavated at the Westwater Reservoir. Significant artefacts were discovered, including several beakers and an important lead necklace.

Archaeological work between 1993 and 1998 at Siller Holes, West Linton, found evidence of lead mining from 12th to 14th centuries. Documented reference to the site only occurred in the late 16th century so it is unknown who was undertaking the mining.

History

The village of Linton is of ancient origin. Its name derives from a Celtic element (cognate with the modern Irish Gaelic linn, Scottish Gaelic linne, and modern Welsh "Llyn") meaning a lake or pool, a pool in a river, or a channel (as in Loch Linnhe, part of which is called An Linne Dhubh, the black pool, or  Dublin, an Anglicisation of dubh and linn, meaning black pool) and the Gaelic "dun" Welsh "din"), for a fortress, fortified place, or military camp (related to the modern English town, by way of the Saxon "tun", a farm or collection of dwellings), and is evidently appropriate, as the village appears to have been surrounded by lakes, pools and marshes. At one time it was known as Lyntoun Roderyck, identified perhaps with Roderyck or Riderch, King of Strathclyde, whose territory included this area, or with a local chieftain of that name. The Scottish Gaelic version of the place name is a partial translation, Ruairidh being a Gaelic form of Roderick. The prefix "West" was acquired many centuries later to clarify the distinction from East Linton in East Lothian.
 
The first written record occurs in the twelfth century, when the Church of "Linton-Ridric" was gifted to the Church of St Mary of Kelso and "the Monks serving God there". The Church remained within the Diocese of Kelso until the Reformation (1560).

The old Edinburgh to Lanark road follows the line of the Pentland Hills. Between Dolphinton and Carlops it is now a right-of-way, approached from West Linton by the Loan or Medwyn Road: it crosses the road from West Linton to Baddinsgill near Medwyn House. This route continues north-west, following the important droving route along which sheep and cattle passed northwards through the Pentlands by way of the Cauldstane Slap for the great trysts at Crieff and Falkirk markets. Livestock from the north came south via the same route to West Linton and Peebles.

Linton was raised to a Burgh of Regality in 1631, with the right to hold fairs and markets. The importance of droving and the markets reached their zenith in the early years of the nineteenth century, when upwards of 30,000 sheep would be sold annually, including the famous Linton breed. The markets at Linton were considered the largest in Scotland and were widely referred to as an expression for any gathering of a large size: "big as a Linton Market."
West Linton had two therapeutic wells, the waters of which were sold on market days for either a penny or a half penny, depending on the well.

There were a tannery and brewery situated on the Upper Green and a gas works on the Lower Green, all now gone. The Manor House at the top of the main street dates from 1578, and is said to have been built on Saturday nights by masons who were engaged by James Douglas, 4th Earl of Morton, Regent of Scotland, to work on his castle of Drochil, seven miles distant down the Lyne valley.

Education
The appointment of a schoolmaster was first recorded in 1604 but there is no note of a schoolhouse until 1657. In 1791 the parish school was situated near the cross. A new parish school was opened in 1864 as a single-storey building and may be seen, somewhat altered, on the opposite side of the main street. At one time it was attended by over eighty pupils, all  accommodated in the single room.  On the Lower Green was a school for females and infants. There was also the Episcopalian School on Chapel Brae, connected with St Mungo's Church.

Children of the United Presbyterian Church congregation attended the Somervail School, built in 1852 from money left for the purpose by James Somervail of Moreham, whose wife was a member of the brewing family of Younger, of long standing in the village. The 'New' School on School Brae was built in 1907 but is now disused, replaced by the new primary school on Deanfoot Road that opened in October 2013.

Climate
As a part of the British Isles, West Linton experiences a maritime climate with cool summers and mild winters. West Linton can be prone to notably low temperatures. Contributing factors include its location in a valley and the relatively elevated position of the village centre at approximately 230m above sea level. It has recorded a number of British low temperature date records, such as -21.8 °C on 12 January 1982, -11.7 °C on 1 April 1917, -10.0 °C on 30 October 1926 and -18.3 °C on 16 November 1919.

Village Greens
West Linton has two village greens, the Lower Green to the south and the Upper Green to the north, the land for which was granted to the inhabitants in perpetuity by the feudal Lord, the Earl of March. In 1729 there was objection on the part of a section of the congregation to the enforced settlement of the minister, and, on the day of ordination in 1731, "riotous scenes" were reported. Soldiers were sent to restore order, and as they forded the river at the Lower Green, they were pelted with stones by the indignant villagers, several of whom were taken to Edinburgh to answer for their disorderly conduct.

Kirks and folk

Adjacent to the Lower Green is the parish church of St. Andrew, flanked by the old graveyard in which stood the original church and manse. In 1780 plans were approved for a new church to be built on the old manse glebe, the minister to be compensated for the loss of his land by the addition of twelve shillings to his stipend. A new manse was built on the glebe land which had been acquired south of the river and in 1782 the new church itself was completed. In 1871 it was enlarged, the roof being raised to accommodate the gallery, larger windows were installed and the spire added. In the succeeding years the wood carvings executed by two local ladies, Miss Jane Fergusson of Spitalhaugh, and Mrs Wodropp of Garvald, were added to the interior walls and gallery. Of note in the graveyard are two bee-boles in the boundary wall in which ministers living in the old manse would place their skeps.

St Mungo's Scottish Episcopal Church sits at the top of the hill over looking this Green.

Rail and road
The Leadburn to Dolphinton branch line which was linked to the Peebles-Edinburgh railway was opened in 1864 and was designed by Thomas Bouch, who was also responsible for the ill-fated Tay Bridge. It was built to facilitate mining and quarrying activities in the area, and although these industries declined, the line led to the expansion of the village to accommodate Edinburgh folk who might rent a house in the summer, or decide to live here permanently, either travelling to work or as a place of retirement.

At the southern end of the main street near the parish church is the old toll house, built in the early nineteenth century at the entrance to the village on the Blyth Bridge to Carlops turnpike road. Tolls were levied on travellers, including the many drovers and their animals passing through the district. The ticket issued entitled the purchaser to pass free of charge through other districts provided they did so on the same day, but anyone attempting to bypass the toll could be fined twenty shillings if caught, and there were also severe penalties for those convicted of damaging or destroying a toll house.

Merchants and craftsmen
At the end of the eighteenth century there were between twenty and thirty looms in the village,  rising to about eighty in the early nineteenth century, some weaving household goods but most weaving cotton cloth for Edinburgh and Glasgow merchants.

It is estimated that in 1834 about fifty hands worked in the mines and quarries of the area. There were collieries near Carlops and Macbiehill, the latter operating until recent times; also quarries producing limestone for agricultural purposes. In 1834 there were five tailors in the village, four dressmakers, two butchers, five carriers, nine retailers of meal, groceries and spirits, two surgeons and four innkeepers.

Notable residents

Although West Linton has never played a significant part in the history of the country, several eminent men have taken up residence in the area. Early in the nineteenth century, John Hay Forbes (1776–1854) was raised to the bench with the title of Lord Medwyn, the name of the estate he had earlier purchased. This association with the Court of Session was maintained in the twentieth century by the Hon. Lord Henry Wallace Guthrie (1903-1970), one of the youngest judges to be appointed to the College of Justice. Fergusson Place perpetuates the memory of Sir William Fergusson of Spitalhaugh (1808–1877), surgeon to Queen Victoria.

The sculptor William Mossman was born here, as was the mathematician, John Brown Clark.

Robert Sanderson (born 1836), the "Laureate of Lynedale", wrote poems and sketches celebrating the Lyne valley, and his handsome tomb erected by his friends may be seen in the graveyard. George Meikle Kemp (1795–1844), the architect of the Scott Monument in Edinburgh, lived for a time near Dolphinton and came to school in the village.

The composer Ronald Stevenson (1928–2015) resided in the village.

Athlete Chris O'Hare is from the village, recently running the 1500m in the 2016 Rio Olympics in Rio, Brazil.

George Johnston, owner of the first motorcar in Scotland and founder of the Arrol-Johnston automotive works was born in West Linton.

The Whipman Play
The Whipman Play is an annual summer festival held in the village, and is one of the Borders' oldest festivals the Whipman being the local man chosen as the focus of festivities. The festival commences on the Friday before the first Saturday in June, and runs until the following Saturday. The Whipman Play Society was formed in 1803 by local young men to alleviate hardship and illness for its members and in the community at large, 42 years before the Poor Law Amendment (Scotland) Act, 1845, and possibly before the first insurance company in Scotland.

Each year a local man is elected to the office of Whipman and he chooses the Whipman's Lass to assist him. These two represent the village at other Lothian and Borders festivals throughout their year in office. The celebrations begin with the Installation of the Whipman & Lass, followed by a celebratory ceilidh. The following day, the Ride Out (of around 80 to 100 horses) introduces the Whipman to the area, and a full week of events culminates in the annual sports day, held on the village green.

In 2020, the summer festival did not take place because of the COVID-19 pandemic. However, to mark the events, silhouette statues were erected around the village during the week, raising money for the Tiny Changes mental health charity in memory of musician Scott Hutchison, whose family live in the area.

See also
List of places in the Scottish Borders
List of places in Scotland

References

External links

CANMORE/RCAHMS record for West Linton, Talla Observatory
RCAHMS record for West Linton
SCRAN image: Former bakery, West Linton
Scottish Natural Heritage (SNH): Evolution of the landscape around Biggar, Carnwath and West Linton
St. Andrew's Church, west Linton
Official Whipman web site
Return to the Ridings
The home of West Lintons Rugby Club for primary school aged children

Villages in the Scottish Borders
Peeblesshire
Parishes in Peeblesshire